Ashna Khvor Rural District is a rural district (dehestan) in the Central District of Khomeyn County, Markazi Province, Iran. At the 2006 census, its population was 4,876, in 1,187 families. The rural district has 12 villages.

References 

Rural Districts of Markazi Province
Khomeyn County